In geometry, a tetragonal trapezohedron, or deltohedron, is the second in an infinite series of trapezohedra, which are dual to the antiprisms. It has eight faces, which are congruent kites, and is dual to the square antiprism.

In mesh generation
This shape has been used as a test case for hexahedral mesh generation, simplifying an earlier test case posited by mathematician Robert Schneiders in the form of a square pyramid with its boundary subdivided into 16 quadrilaterals. In this context the tetragonal trapezohedron has also been called the cubical octahedron,  quadrilateral octahedron, or octagonal spindle, because it has eight quadrilateral faces and is uniquely defined as a combinatorial polyhedron by that property. Adding four cuboids to a mesh for the cubical octahedron would also give a mesh for Schneiders' pyramid. As a simply-connected polyhedron with an even number of quadrilateral faces, the cubical octahedron can be decomposed into topological cuboids with curved faces that meet face-to-face without subdividing the boundary quadrilaterals,  and an explicit mesh of this type has been constructed. However, it is unclear whether a decomposition of this type can be obtained in which all the cuboids are convex polyhedra with flat faces.

In art
A tetragonal trapezohedron appears in the upper left as one of the polyhedral "stars" in M. C. Escher's 1948 wood engraving Stars.

Spherical tiling
The tetragonal trapezohedron also exists as a spherical tiling, with 2 vertices on the poles, and alternating vertices equally spaced above and below the equator.

Related polyhedra

The tetragonal trapezohedron is first in a series of dual snub polyhedra and tilings with face configuration V3.3.4.3.n.

References

External links 
Paper model tetragonal (square) trapezohedron
 

Polyhedra